CKJR is a radio station in Wetaskiwin, Alberta, broadcasting at 1440 AM. It is owned by Stingray Group (formerly by Newcap Radio). The station currently broadcasts an oldies format branded as W1440. CKJR broadcasts with a non-directional pattern during the daytime hours and a directional signal (using a three-tower array) during nighttime hours. CKJR is the only station in Canada broadcasting at 1440 AM.

History 
 The station started in 1971 as CJOI on 1440 kHz, with 1,000 watts power.
 In 1974, CJOI started using 10,000 watts power
 CJOI became CKJR in 1994 (new call appears in World Radio TV Handbook 1995)
 In 2002, Standard Broadcasting purchased stations and sold parts to Newcap Broadcasting and Rogers Communications.
 CJOI is now an FM radio station in Rimouski, Quebec.
 In late September 2006, CKJR changed formats from country to oldies, and a name change from Cat Country 1440 KJR to W1440 (meaning Wetaskiwin 1440).

External links
W1440

Kjr
Kjr
Kjr
Radio stations established in 1971
Wetaskiwin
1971 establishments in Alberta